Robert McLaren (17 December 1856 – 22 April 1940) was Unionist MP for North Lanarkshire (UK Parliament constituency) from 1918 to 1922.

He was a supporter of David Lloyd George's coalition government.

References

External links 
 

1856 births
1940 deaths
Members of the Parliament of the United Kingdom for Scottish constituencies
UK MPs 1918–1922
Unionist Party (Scotland) MPs